Reduction of Hours of Work (Public Works) Convention, 1936 is  an International Labour Organization Convention.

It was established in 1936, with the preamble stating:
Considering that the question of the reduction of hours of work on public works undertaken or subsidised by Governments is the third item on the agenda of the Session;,...

Withdrawn
The convention was never brought into force, and was withdrawn at the ILO General Conference May 30, 2000.

Ratifications
The convention was not ratified by any states.

External links 
Text.

International Labour Organization conventions
Working time
Treaties concluded in 1936
Treaties not entered into force
1936 in labor relations